Renford may refer to:

Renford Bambrough (1926–1999), British philosopher
Renford Cogle (born 1948), singer and songwriter
Renford Reese, professor at California State Polytechnic University
Renford Rejects, teen sitcom between 1997 and 2001
Des Renford MBE (1927–1999), Australian long-distance swimmer

See also
Brentford
Enford
Trent Ford